Changayi (English: Friend) is a 2021 Malayalam drama film directed by Sudhesh Kumar starring Amal Shah and Bhagath Manuel.

Synopsis
The movie talks about the friendship between Plus 2 students, Irfan and Manu, who belong to two different religions.

Cast
Amal Shah
Govind V Pai
Bhagath Manuel 
Jaffar Idukki

References

2021 films
2020s Malayalam-language films
2021 drama films